John Benson (born 27 August 1991 in Obuasi) is a Qatari born-Ghanaian footballer. He plays defender for Al-Markhiya.

Career 
Benson began his career with Shaggy FC. He also joined Ajax Football Academy in Obuasi before he transferred in 2006 to Goldfields academy. In February 2006 he signed with ASPIRE Academy for Sports Excellence and after the 2009 FIFA U-20 World Cup signed for the Qatar Stars League side Al Ahli.

International career
He represented the Ghana U-20 team in Egypt at the 2009 FIFA U-20 World Cup.

Recognition

Ghana U-20 

 FIFA U-20 World Cup Champion: 2009

References 

1991 births
Living people
Qatari footballers
Ghanaian footballers
Ghana under-20 international footballers
Ghanaian expatriate footballers
Expatriate footballers in Qatar
Ghanaian expatriate sportspeople in Qatar
Qatar Stars League players
Qatari Second Division players
Al Ahli SC (Doha) players
Mesaimeer SC players
Al-Markhiya SC players
Footballers from Accra
Ashanti Gold SC players
Aspire Academy (Qatar) players
Association football defenders
Ghanaian emigrants to Qatar
Naturalised citizens of Qatar